Paul Hopkins (born July 12, 1968) is a Canadian television, film and theatre actor. He is also a theatre producer and director.

Career

As an actor, he is best known for his portrayal of Michael "Mouse" Tolliver in the TV miniseries More Tales of the City (1998) and its follow-up Further Tales of the City (2001). These miniseries were sequels to Tales of the City (1993), which starred Marcus D'Amico in the role of Mouse. Paul is also known for his portrayal of Karl in the Canadian TV series Vampire High (2001–2002) and Jim Bouchard on 19-2.

Between 2004–2005, Hopkins spent two seasons with the Stratford Festival of Canada, where he was a member of The Birmingham Conservatory of Classical Theatre Training.

In 2007, he became the Artistic Director and Producer of Repercussion Theatre, Montreal's touring Shakespeare-in-the-Park company, a position he held until 2015. During his tenure he oversaw over 200 presentations seen by over 70,000 people throughout Greater Montreal and the Province of Quebec. These presentations included 7 Shakespeare-in-the-Park tours, two co-productions with The Montreal Baroque Festival (Macbeth in Hell: A Cabaret! and Henry Purcell's The Fairy Queen), Shakespeare Unplugged,  and, in collaboration with Centaur Theatre's Wildside Festival, Repercussion Theatre presented Raoul Bhaneja's Hamlet Solo and Teaching Hamlet by Keir Cutler.

While at Repercussion Theatre, Hopkins conceived innovative ways to create strong community ties and loyal audiences. Since 2010, approximately 100 local youth were featured in cameo roles in the summer productions and children's workshops were added, resulting in pre-show vignettes performed by the young participants that were introduced to Shakespeare and live theatre in a fun, interactive way. Repercussion Theatre also became a research partner in a five-year project called Early Modern Conversions, Religions, Cultures, Cognitive Ecologies led by McGill University’s Institute for the Public Life of Arts and Ideas (IPLAI).

In 2013, Hopkins' efforts were recognized when he was named one of three finalists for the Christopher Plummer Award of Excellence in Classical Theatre by the Shakespeare Globe Centre of Canada.

Filmography

References

External links 
 
Official site

1968 births
Living people
Canadian male film actors
Canadian male television actors
Canadian male voice actors
Male actors from Ottawa